The Ragged Edge may refer to:

 The Ragged Edge (film), a 1923 film
 "The Ragged Edge" (Babylon 5), an episode of the TV series Babylon 5
 Ragged Edge, or The Rag, a disabled-rights magazine
 A Wrinkle in the Skin, a 1965 novel also known as The Ragged Edge

See also